Scrioaștea is a commune in Teleorman County, Muntenia, Romania. It is composed of four villages: Brebina, Cucueți, Scrioaștea and Viile.

References

Communes in Teleorman County
Localities in Muntenia